The Venture 222 is an American trailerable sailboat that was designed by Roger MacGregor as a cruiser and first built in 1971.

The Venture 222 was developed from the 1968 Venture 22. The MacGregor 22 is also  similar.

Production
The design was built by MacGregor Yacht Corporation in the United States, from 1971 until 1982, but it is now out of production.

Design
The Venture 222 is a recreational keelboat, built predominantly of fiberglass, with wood trim. It has a masthead sloop rig, a raked stem, a slightly angled transom, a transom-hung rudder controlled by a tiller and a retractable swing keel. The design is equipped with a "pop-top" to increase cabin headroom. It has positive foam flotation making it unsinkable. The boat displaces  and carries  of iron ballast.

The boat is normally fitted with a small  outboard motor for docking and maneuvering.

The design has sleeping accommodation for five people, with a double "V"-berth in the bow cabin, drop-down dinette table that forms a small double berth on the starboard side of the main cabin and an aft quarter berth on the port side. The galley is located on the port side just aft of the bow cabin and is equipped with a two-burner stove and a sink. The head is located in the bow cabin on the starboard side under the "V"-berth.

Operational history
In a 2010 review Steve Henkel noted that the boat has "cheap construction".

See also
List of sailing boat types

References

Keelboats
1970s sailboat type designs
Sailing yachts 
Trailer sailers
Sailboat type designs by Roger MacGregor
Sailboat types built by the MacGregor Yacht Corporation